Sim Gyu-hae (also known as Shim Kyu-hae, born 1 February 1965) is a South Korean former sailor. He competed in the Tornado event at the 1988 Summer Olympics.

References

External links
 
 

1965 births
Living people
South Korean male sailors (sport)
Olympic sailors of South Korea
Sailors at the 1988 Summer Olympics – Tornado
Place of birth missing (living people)